Shahid Rajaee Dam, also known as the Soleyman Tangeh Dam, is an arch dam on the Tajan River, located about  south of Sari in Mazandaran Province, Iran. The dam was built for hydroelectric power production, flood control and to provide water for industrial and agricultural use. Construction on the dam began in 1987 and it was complete in 1997. In 2000 the power plant portion of the project was given to Iran Water & Power Resources Development Co. from the Mazandaran Regional Water Authority. An earthquake halted the project in 2002 but the power plant was completed in 2007.

It is named after ex-prime minister and president of Iran, Mohammad-Ali Rajai who was killed in a terrorist attack.

See also

 List of power stations in Iran
 List of tallest dams in the world
 Port of Shahid Rajaee

References

Hydroelectric power stations in Iran
Arch dams
Dams completed in 1997
Dams in Mazandaran Province
Energy infrastructure completed in 2007
1997 establishments in Iran
Buildings and structures in Mazandaran Province
Tourist attractions in Mazandaran Province
Tourist attractions in Sari